Children of Invention is an American independent feature film written and directed by Tze Chun. It premiered at the 2009 Sundance Film Festival, screened at more than 50 film festivals, and won 17 festival awards including 8 Grand Jury or Best Narrative Feature prizes.  The film was released theatrically in eight U.S. cities beginning February 2010, on Video-on-Demand in June 2010, and on DVD in August 2010.

Plot
The first half of the movie centers around Elaine Cheng (played by Cindy Cheung), a single mother and immigrant living in the Boston suburbs, and the life she provides for her two children (played by Michael Chen and Crystal Chiu). As a way to cope and entertain themselves, the kids invent things. The mother is drawn to pyramid schemes as a way to get ahead and repeatedly loses money. Eventually her two young children are left to fend for themselves when their mother is arrested by the police.  The film is loosely based on Tze Chun's own childhood, as well as his Sundance 2007 short film, Windowbreaker.

Production
Though set in Boston, the film shot 20 days in and around New York City and 4 days in Boston.  The film premiered at Sundance just 10 months after the first draft of the script was completed.

Critical reception
The film was very well received by critics, including The New York Times, Los Angeles Times, The Village Voice, New York Post, Variety, LA Weekly, USA Today, Chicago Reader, Film Threat, and The Boston Globe.  It was named one of the Top 13 Films of 2009 by Hammer to Nail, and one of the best undistributed films of 2009 by several critics including IFC's Alison Willmore.  In 2010, the year of its commercial release, it made several more "best films of the year" lists including the list by Turner Classic Movies' blog.

Accolades
The film also won the following 17 festival awards:

 Grand Jury Prize, Best Narrative Feature - Independent Film Festival of Boston
 Grand Jury Prize, Best Narrative Feature - Newport International Film Festival
 Grand Jury Prize, Best Narrative Feature - Los Angeles Asian Pacific Film Festival
 Grand Jury Prize, Best Film - San Diego Asian Film Festival
 Best Narrative Feature - San Diego Asian Film Festival
 Best Narrative Feature - Ojai-Ventura International Film Festival
 Outstanding International Feature - ReelWorld Film Festival
 Best of Festival - Roxbury Film Festival
 Special Jury Prize, Best Narrative Feature - Sarasota Film Festival
 Special Jury Award - San Francisco International Asian American Film Festival
 Special Jury Prize, Acting Ensemble - Nashville Film Festival
 Special Jury Prize, New Talent to Watch in Acting - Los Angeles Asian Pacific Film Festival
 Special Jury Prize, Emotional Storytelling - Indie Memphis Film Festival
 Honorable Mention, Editing - Woodstock Film Festival
 George C. Lin Emerging Filmmaker Award - DC Asian Pacific American Film Festival
 Puma Emerging Filmmaker Award - Hawaii International Film Festival
 Visionary Award - Austin Asian American Film Festival

Distribution
Tze Chun and the film's producer Mynette Louie were named in Ted Hope's list of "21 Great Free Thinkers of Indie Film" for their DIY festival/DVD distribution strategy.  The film debuted theatrically in Boston on February 26, 2010, and in New York and Los Angeles on March 12, 2010, followed by additional theatrical engagements in other cities.  It was released on Video-on-Demand beginning in June 2010, and on DVD on August 10, 2010.

References

External links
 
 
 
 
 
 
 Sundance Channel Interview with Tze Chun, Cindy Cheung, Michael Chen, and Crystal Chiu
 Ningin Interview with Tze Chun
 Park City Record article about film's pyramid scheme theme

2009 films
2009 drama films
Films about Chinese Americans
American coming-of-age drama films
Films set in Boston
Films shot in Massachusetts
Films shot in New York (state)
Films shot in New York City
American independent films
2009 directorial debut films
2000s coming-of-age drama films
2009 independent films
Asian-American drama films
2000s English-language films
2000s American films